Jérémy Chardy and Fabrice Martin were the defending champions, but Chardy chose not to participate and Martin chose to compete in Rio de Janeiro instead.

Nicolas Mahut and Vasek Pospisil won the title, defeating Wesley Koolhof and Nikola Mektić in the final, 6–3, 6–4.

Seeds

Draw

Draw

References

External links
 Main draw

2020 ATP Tour
2020 Doubles
2020 in French tennis